Biar is a town in southern Spain.

Biar or BIAR may also refer to:
 Biar, Iran, a village in western Iran
 Biar-e Kord, a village in northeastern Iran
 Akureyri Airport (ICAO code: BIAR), an airport in Iceland

See also 
 El Biar, a suburb of Algiers, Algeria
 Biars-sur-Cère, a commune in southwestern France
 Bier (disambiguation)
 Bere (disambiguation)
 Beer (disambiguation)
 Bia (disambiguation)